Franklin High School or Franklin Senior High School may refer to:
 Benjamin Franklin High School (New York City)
 Benjamin Franklin High School (New Orleans)
 Benjamin Franklin High School (Philadelphia)
 Felicity-Franklin High School, Felicity, Ohio
 Franklin High School (Elk Grove, California)
 Franklin High School (Los Angeles, California)
 Franklin High School (Stockton, California)
 Franklin Senior High School (Indiana)
 Franklin High School (Reisterstown, Maryland)
 Franklin High School (Massachusetts)
 Franklin High School (Livonia, Michigan)
 Franklin High School (New Hampshire)
 Franklin High School (New Jersey), in Somerset County
 Franklin High School (Sussex County, New Jersey)
 Franklin High School (North Carolina)
 Franklin High School (Franklin, Ohio)
 Franklin High School (Portland, Oregon)
 Franklin High School (Tennessee)
 Franklin High School (El Paso, Texas)
 Franklin High School (Franklin, Texas)
 Franklin High School (Virginia)
 Franklin High School (Seattle), Washington
 Franklin High School (Wisconsin)

See also
Franklin County High School (disambiguation)
Franklin Parish High School
Franklin School (disambiguation)
List of places named for Benjamin Franklin #Elementary, middle, and high schools